Persatuan Sepakbola Indonesia Manggarai (simply known as Persim Manggarai) is an Indonesian football club based in Manggarai Regency, East Nusa Tenggara. They currently compete in the Liga 3.

References

External links

Football clubs in Indonesia
Football clubs in East Nusa Tenggara
Association football clubs established in 1958
1958 establishments in Indonesia